NYAC is the initialism for:

New York Athletic Club
National Youth Advocacy Coalition
Northumberland Youth Advisory Council, Ontario, Canada